Maryia Viktorovna Smolyachkova (born 10 February 1985 in Minsk) is a female hammer thrower from Belarus. Her personal best throw is 74.65 metres, achieved in July 2008 in Minsk.

Achievements

References

External links

1985 births
Living people
Belarusian female hammer throwers
Athletes (track and field) at the 2004 Summer Olympics
Athletes (track and field) at the 2008 Summer Olympics
Olympic athletes of Belarus
Athletes from Minsk
Competitors at the 2003 Summer Universiade
Competitors at the 2007 Summer Universiade
Competitors at the 2009 Summer Universiade